Salvador García (born 24 August 1899, date of death unknown) was a Spanish fencer. He competed in the individual and team foil events at the 1924 Summer Olympics.

References

External links
 

1899 births
Year of death missing
Spanish male foil fencers
Olympic fencers of Spain
Fencers at the 1924 Summer Olympics